Gavro Vuković (1852, Lijeva Rijeka, Principality of Montenegro – 29 July 1928, Berane, Kingdom of SCS) also known as Vojvoda Gavro (Војвода Гавро) was a jurist, senator of the Principality of Montenegro, a military commander, Yugoslav politician and writer.

Biography
Gavro Vuković was the son of Montenegrin senator, hero, and chief Miljan Vukov Vešović of the Vasojević clan, a Serb tribe in northeastern Montenegro (at the time known as "Montenegro and the Hills"). He took his surname Vuković after his grandfather Vuko. His brother Todor (1853–1886) was a commander of the Upper Vasojevići-Lijeva Rijeka brigade.

He attended elementary school in the Serbian Orthodox monastery Đurđevi Stupovi (Berane), and in Cetinje. He attended high school in Nice and graduated in 1869 in Belgrade. He graduated from the University of Belgrade's Law School in 1873 and was the first Montenegrin to reach that degree of education. After returning to Montenegro, he took high positions in the government. He became the Secretary of Senate in 1874 and after that a member of the High Court. After participating in the Montenegrin-Ottoman War (1876-1878), he undertook high diplomatic missions concerning the aftermath of Berlin Congress and therefore was named Montenegrin ambassador in Istanbul, the capital of the Ottoman Empire (modern Turkey). Gavro became a minister of foreign affairs in the Principality of Montenegro in October 1899 and held that position until December 1905. From 1906 to 1908, he was the president of the National Senate and was twice elected as a deputy in Parliament, in 1906 and 1914. In the Kingdom of Serbs, Croats and Slovenes he was a member of the Montenegrin Federalist Party and again took the position of ambassador in Istanbul. He was buried next to the monastery Djurdjevi Stupovi, in the vicinity of Berane.

References

External links

Биографија Гаврa Вуковића

1852 births
1928 deaths
People of the Principality of Montenegro
University of Belgrade Faculty of Law alumni
Montenegrin Federalist Party politicians
Vasojevići
Montenegrin military personnel
People of the Kingdom of Montenegro
Yugoslav politicians
Montenegrin diplomats
Montenegrin nationalists
Dukes of Montenegro